Chan Chin-wei and Caroline Garcia were the defending champions, having won the event in 2012, but Garcia decided not to participate. Chan partnered up with Hsu Wen-hsin but lost in the semifinals.

Lesley Kerkhove and Arantxa Rus won the title, defeating Chen Yi and Luksika Kumkhum in the final, 6–4, 2–6, [14–12].

Seeds

Draw

References 
 Draw

Caesar and Imperial Cup - Doubles